Mentone Grammar (formerly known as simply The Boys' Grammar in the local community) is an independent, Anglican co-educational grammar day school in Mentone, a suburb of Melbourne, Victoria, Australia.

History
Mentone Grammar School was founded on the 3rd of March, 1923 by a group of Anglicans who had a high profile in the town, supported by the local Mentone Anglican vicar. Mentone Grammar remained a boys only school until 2006 when the school decided to accept female students. Prior to this, the school hierarchy announced, in July 2005, its co-educational intent after a merger proposal put forth by the Board of Management was rejected by nearby Mentone Girls' Grammar School, its sister school.

The School has adopted a parallel learning approach, where boys and girls are together in coeducational classes from Kindergarten to Year 4, from Year 5-9 the two are separate, and in Year 10, 11 and 12 students are in co-educational (mixed gender) classes again.  All year levels are coeducational, except the middle years 5–9, when students learn in single gender classes.

As of 2022, annual fees for a Year 12 student studying at Mentone Grammar were slightly over $30,000.

Heads

Headmasters/Principals
There have been a total of eight Principals (formerly Headmasters) of Mentone Grammar School since the school was founded in 1923. The current Principal of Mentone is Malcolm Cater (since 2007).

Cadet Unit
The Mentone Grammar School Army Cadet Unit (MTGSACU) is an Australian Army Cadets school based unit, founded and operating continuously since 1943. It is part of the 31st Battalion (Melbourne Schools). It once was compulsory in Years 9, 10 and 11, however the emphasis once placed on the cadet unit is no longer fostered. The MTGSACU does not complete the full Recruit Induction Package instead an in-house recruit program and promotion courses are run. This is due to time constraints and frequency of sessions allocated in the school curriculum. Participation remains compulsory for Year 9's. Due to the growth of the school, the Cadet unit (as of 2020) once again has a strength of over 400 Cadets. It Currently has 16 Recruit Platoons, 3 Advanced Platoons and a Headquarters Company. This makes it one of the largest cadet units in Australia. It runs training days throughout the year with an annual camp once a year at the Puckapunyal Military Area.

Sport
The Year 2010 has seen Mentone lure past star sportsmen back to the school to coach winter sports teams.  An initiative developed by the past sports-master Andrew Hayes, the idea has already led to success in the winter sport teams, an area where Mentone have struggled before.
On Saturday 29 January 2022, Mentone Grammar's Head Prefect Evie Stansby (Year 12) made Mentone Grammar sporting history by becoming the first female to earn a place on our First XI cricket team.

AGSV & AGSV/APS premierships 
Mentone Grammar has won the following AGSV & AGSV/APS premierships.

Boys:

 Athletics (6) - 1982, 1983, 1984, 1986, 1987, 1996
 Cricket (10) - 1965, 1966, 1975, 1984, 1986, 1987, 2000, 2002, 2007, 2015
 Golf - 2005
 Soccer - 1993
 Squash (2) - 2001, 2002
 Swimming (36) - 1965, 1966, 1967, 1968, 1969, 1970, 1971, 1972, 1973, 1974, 1975, 1976, 1977, 1978, 1979, 1982, 1983, 1984, 1985, 1986, 1987, 1995, 1996, 2003, 2004, 2005, 2006, 2010, 2011, 2012, 2014, 2015, 2016, 2017, 2018, 2019
 Table Tennis (4) - 2004, 2006, 2007, 2008
 Tennis (19) - 1961, 1966, 1974, 1976, 1979, 1980, 1981, 1982, 1983, 1984, 1985, 2000, 2001, 2002, 2003, 2005, 2006, 2012, 2016
 Volleyball (4) - 2010, 2016, 2018, 2019

Girls:

 Athletics - 2019
 Cross Country (3) - 2017, 2018, 2019
 Swimming (6) - 2014, 2015, 2016, 2017, 2018, 2022
 Touch Football (6) - 2017, 2018, 2019, 2020, 2021, 2022

Notable alumni

Administration
 Tim Brailsford, Vice-Chancellor and President of Bond University
 Karl Duldig (1902–1986), Austrian-Australian sculptor; art master from 1945-67
 Sir Robert Gillman Allen Jackson AC, KCVO, CMG, OBE, OWL, former United Nations administrator

Business 
 James Riady, Deputy Chairman of the Lippo Group

Entertainment
 Lee Cormie, Australian Actor
 Jared Daperis, actor
 Daniel Daperis, actor
 Bill Granger, restaurateur and food writer
 Russell Hitchcock, lead singer of soft rock duo Air Supply
 Mal Walden, co-anchor of Melbourne's Channel 10 News at 5

Military 
 Air Vice Marshal Richard Bomball AO AFC - Commandant of the Australian Defence Force Academy
 Major General Derek Deighton AO, MBE

Sport
 Joel Amartey, AFL player with the Sydney Swans
 Mitchell Brown - Geelong Football Club, Essendon Football Club player
 Gary Colling, former Australian rules football player for St Kilda Football Club
 Leigh Fisher, St Kilda Football Club player
 Oliver Florent, AFL player with the Sydney Swans
 Alex Hillhouse, Athlete, competed in 1932 Summer Olympics and 1930 British Empire Games
 Kate Hore, AFL Women's player with the Melbourne Football Club
 John Howat, former Melbourne Football Club & Richmond Football Club player
 Andrew Ilie, former Australian tennis player
 Abbi Moloney, AFL Women's player with the Collingwood Football Club
 Courteney Munn, AFL Women's player with the St Kilda Football Club
 Rod Owen, former Melbourne Football Club, Brisbane Bears Football Club and St Kilda Football Club footballer
 John Peers, Australian Doubles Tennis player
 Peter Russo, former Hawthorn Football Club player
 Simon Storey, soccer player for Melbourne Victory
 Shane Warne, former Australian cricketer
 Dav Whatmore, former Australian cricketer
 David Wilson, 1988 Olympic swimmer
 Mitchito Owens-AFL footballer

See also
 Victorian Certificate of Education
 Australian Army Cadets

References

External links

 Mentone Grammar School

Anglican secondary schools in Melbourne
Associated Grammar Schools of Victoria
Educational institutions established in 1923
Member schools of the Headmasters' and Headmistresses' Conference
Junior School Heads Association of Australia Member Schools
1923 establishments in Australia
Buildings and structures in the City of Kingston (Victoria)